Luigi Cevenini (13 March 1895 – 23 July 1968) was an Italian football player and coach who played as a forward.

Club career
Throughout his career, Cevenini played 190 times for Internazionale and scored 186 goals, winning the Italian Prima Divisione title in 1920.
The height of his individual career though was, while playing for Juventus Football Club, not so much because of his 3 top 3 seasons but because he reached the top of his Italy career, while a Juventus player.

International career
With the Italy national football team, Cevenini scored 11 goals in 29 matches between 1915 and 1929, winning the 1927–30 Central European International Cup, playing the first 2 matches. He was Italy's captain between 1925 and 1927.

Personal life
His older brothers Aldo Cevenini and Mario Cevenini and younger brothers Cesare Cevenini and Carlo Cevenini all played football professionally, with Aldo playing 11 games for Italy. To distinguish them, Aldo was known as Cevenini I, Mario as Cevenini II, Luigi as Cevenini III, Cesare as Cevenini IV and Carlo as Cevenini V.

Honours

Club
 Internazionale
 Prima Categoria: 1919–20
 Novese
 Prima Categoria: 1921–22

International
Italy
 Central European International Cup: 1927-30

External links
International Goal Scoring Record

References

1895 births
1968 deaths
Footballers from Milan
Italian footballers
Italy international footballers
A.C. Milan players
Inter Milan players
Juventus F.C. players
A.C.R. Messina players
Novara F.C. players
Como 1907 players
S.S. Arezzo players
Italian football managers
A.C.R. Messina managers
Como 1907 managers
S.S. Arezzo managers
Serie A players
Association football forwards
U.S.D. Novese players